Pouteria eerwah is a rare species of Australian rainforest tree in the family Sapotaceae. Common names include shiny-leaved condoo, black plum and wild apple. It is endemic to south eastern Queensland, with a restricted distribution and regarded as endangered. There is discussion whether this plant should remain named as Planchonella eerwah.

The tree was first described as Sideroxylon eerwah in 1894 by Frederick Manson Bailey,<ref>{{APNI | name =  'Sideroxylon eerwah F.M.Bailey | id = 20356}}</ref> before being moved to its current binomial name by Baehni in 1942. The species name is derived from Mount Eerwah near Eumundi in Queensland. It has leathery leaves with prominent raised veins which measure  in length. Flowers and fruit can be found in any season. The flowers are a cream-green colour and hairy and are about 4 mm long.

It is restricted to three locations in southeastern Queensland. It grows on rocky slopes in vine thickets and rainforest. Dominant associated species in southern populations include hoop pine (Araucaria cunninghamii), Harpullia pendula, and members of the genus Flindersia, and in the northern Argyrodendron species, Atalaya multiflora, Choricarpia subargentea, Excoecaria dallachyana, and Flindersia australis.

Threats include overrunning of habitat by weeds such as lantana (Lantana camara), and in the Sunshine Coast glycine (Neonotonia whitii), corky passionflower (Passiflora suberosa), and umbrella tree (Schefflera actinophylla''). Feral pigs eat the fruit and seeds.

References

Flora of Queensland
eerwah